The Downtown Churches Historic District is a historic district in downtown Sheboygan, Wisconsin consisting of four churches and five other buildings associated with the churches. The four churches which comprise the district are Grace Episcopal Church, built in the High Victorian Gothic style in 1871; First Methodist Episcopal Church, built in 1929–30 in the Late Gothic style; Hope Reformed Church, built in 1937 in the Late Gothic style; and St. Martin Lutheran Church, built in 1968 in a contemporary style. The churches serve as historical examples of a century's worth of religious architecture spanning four different faiths and a variety of styles. In addition, the first Boy Scout troop in Wisconsin was founded in Grace Episcopal Church in 1911. The district was added to the National Register of Historic Places on March 1, 2010.

References

Churches on the National Register of Historic Places in Wisconsin
Greek Revival church buildings in Wisconsin
Gothic Revival church buildings in Wisconsin
Churches completed in 1911
Buildings and structures in Sheboygan, Wisconsin
Churches in Sheboygan County, Wisconsin
Historic districts on the National Register of Historic Places in Wisconsin
National Register of Historic Places in Sheboygan County, Wisconsin